Anzor Zurabovich Sanaya (born 22 May 1989) is a Russian professional football coach and a former player. He is an assistant coach with Pari NN.

Club career
He made his Russian Premier League debut for FC Orenburg on 30 July 2016 in a game against FC Rostov.

Personal life
He is a son of Zurab Sanaya.

External links
 
 

1989 births
People from Mineralnye Vody
Sportspeople from Stavropol Krai
Russian people of Abkhazian descent
Living people
Russian footballers
Association football forwards
FC Baltika Kaliningrad players
FC Sportakademklub Moscow players
FC Lokomotiv Moscow players
FC Spartak Kostroma players
FC Tekstilshchik Ivanovo players
FC Tom Tomsk players
FC Orenburg players
PFC Sochi players
FC Rotor Volgograd players
FC Yenisey Krasnoyarsk players
Russian Premier League players
Russian First League players
Russian Second League players